Psammodromius is a genus of ground beetles in the family Carabidae. There are at least three described species in Psammodromius.

Species
These three species belong to the genus Psammodromius:
 Psammodromius mirzayani Morvan, 1977  (Iran)
 Psammodromius noctivagus Peyerimhoff, 1927  (Egypt)
 Psammodromius zajtzewi (Eichler, 1924)  (Southeast Europe and Southwest Asia)

References

Lebiinae